Peter Lucas (23 November 1929 – 16 September 2019) was an Australian rules footballer, who played for Collingwood in the Victorian Football League (VFL).

Peter Lucas was a regular half back flanker in the Collingwood team.  His 177 VFL games between 1949 and 1959 included the winning 1958 Grand Final against Melbourne. He was a member of what the historian (and passionate Carlton supporter) Manning Clark called, 31 years after it had last played together, “that great half-back line of Lucas, Kingston and Tuck”. Later Lucas was an administrator and general manager at Collingwood after retiring from playing football in 1959.

References

External links

Profile from Collingwood Forever

Australian rules footballers from Victoria (Australia)
Collingwood Football Club players
Collingwood Football Club Premiership players
Collingwood Football Club administrators
1929 births
2019 deaths
One-time VFL/AFL Premiership players